Centre Street Bridge may refer to:

 Centre Street Bridge (Newark) in Newark, New Jersey, no longer standing
 Centre Street Bridge (Calgary) in Calgary, Alberta, Canada; seen in the movie Exit Wounds.